This is a list of National Wildlife Refuges (NWR) established specifically for the protection of one or more endangered species.

See also
List of National Wildlife Refuges
List of endangered species

References
Official FWS list

Endangered species

Nature-related lists
United States environment-related lists